Zanobi del Rosso (1724–1798) was an Italian architect. He designed the Kaffeehaus in the Boboli Gardens.

References 

1724 births
1798 deaths
18th-century Italian architects